Ladislav Trpkoš (17 January 1915 in Vysoké Mýto – 30 November 2004) was a Czech basketball player. He was voted to the Czechoslovakian 20th Century Team in 2001.

National team career
Trpkoš competed with the senior Czechoslovakian national team at the 1936 Summer Olympics. With Czechoslovakia, he won the gold medal at the 1946 EuroBasket, and the silver medal at the 1947 EuroBasket. He also competed with Czechoslovakia at the 1948 Summer Olympics.

References

External links
FIBA Profile
part 7 the basketball tournament

1915 births
2004 deaths
Czechoslovak men's basketball players
Czech men's basketball players
Olympic basketball players of Czechoslovakia
Basketball players at the 1936 Summer Olympics
Basketball players at the 1948 Summer Olympics
FIBA EuroBasket-winning players
People from Vysoké Mýto
Sportspeople from the Pardubice Region